Garra imberba is a species of ray-finned fish in the genus Garra from Yangtze, upper Mekong and Red River basins in China and Vietnam.

References 

Garra
Fish described in 1912